Bonchis scoparioides is a species of snout moth in the genus Bonchis. It was described by Francis Walker in 1862. It is found in Pará, Brazil.

References

Chrysauginae
Moths described in 1862